Kajabbi is a rural town in the locality of Three Rivers, Shire of Cloncurry,  Queensland, Australia.

Geography 
The town is small, described by a travel writer as "no more than a pub and a couple of houses". The Kalkadoon Hotel is the only commercial business in the town.

History
The town takes its name from the former Kajabbi railway station, which was named by Queensland Railways Department on 29 April 1915. It is reportedly an Aboriginal word, meaning kite hawk.

Nearby Battle Mountain was the scene of an armed conflict between local Kalkadoon people and European cattlemen supported by the armed forces. Many of the local Aborigines were killed.

Kajabbi State School opened on 15 September 1919 and closed on 28 January 1975.

In the 1920s Kajabbi was a service centre for nearby copper mines at Dobbyn and Mount Cuthbert. The town was a railhead on the Mount Cuthbert and Dobbyn railway lines and cattle from a wide area of north west Queensland were brought to the town to be railed to Cloncurry and onwards. Kajabbi Post Office opened on 13 June 1927 (a receiving office had been open from 1917) and closed in 1973.

In 2009 the Kalkadoon Hotel closed citing problems with meeting regulatory requirements.

Heritage listings
Kajabbi has a number of heritage-listed sites, including:
 North-West of Kajabbi Township: Mount Cuthbert Township and Smelter

References

External links

 

Towns in Queensland
Shire of Cloncurry